Morrissey v. Brewer, 408 U.S. 471 (1972), was a United States Supreme Court case that provided for a hearing, before a "neutral and detached" hearing body such as a parole board, to determine the factual basis for parole violations. This hearing is colloquially known as a "Morrissey hearing."

The hearing can take place with the defendant in or out of custody. If applicable, a victim may be ordered to testify at a hearing. During the hearing, a member of the Parole Hearing Division reviews the evidence of the violation.

The parolee is usually present and can present witnesses and documentary evidence and ask the victim questions. But in extreme cases the victim can be interviewed outside the parolee's presence. If this happens, the parolee can leave a list of questions for the victim to answer. Evidence including letters, affidavits, and other material that would not be admissible in an adversary criminal trial can be allowed in a Morrissey hearing.

After the hearing, the factfinders issue a written statement as to the evidence relied upon and reasons for revoking parole. The victim can be notified about the outcome.

Brennan and Marshall noted in their concurrence, "The only question open under our precedents is whether counsel must be furnished the parolee if he is indigent."

References

External links
 
Appellate Defenders, Inc., Legal Lingo

United States Supreme Court cases
1972 in United States case law
United States criminal due process case law
Parole in the United States
United States Supreme Court cases of the Burger Court